is a Japanese footballer currently playing as a midfielder for Vegalta Sendai.

Career statistics

Club
.

Notes

References

External links

1998 births
Living people
Ryutsu Keizai University alumni
Japanese footballers
Association football midfielders
Japan Football League players
J1 League players
Vegalta Sendai players